Kiran Mandal is an Indian politician and member of the Bharatiya Janata Party. Mandal is a member of the Uttarakhand Legislative Assembly from the Sitarganj constituency in Udham Singh Nagar district.

References 

Bharatiya Janata Party politicians from Uttarakhand
Members of the Uttarakhand Legislative Assembly
21st-century Indian politicians
Indian National Congress politicians
Living people
Year of birth missing (living people)
People from Udham Singh Nagar district